The FitzGerald Bluffs are prominent north-facing bluffs,  long, located  south of the Snow Nunataks in Palmer Land, Antarctica. They were discovered by the Ronne Antarctic Research Expedition (1947–48) under Finn Ronne, who named the bluffs after Gerald FitzGerald, Chief Topographic Engineer with the United States Geological Survey, 1947–57.

See also
O'Neill Peak

References 

Cliffs of Palmer Land